Baron Kilmaine is a title that has been created twice, both times in the Peerage of Ireland. The first creation came in 1722 in favour of the soldier the Hon. James O'Hara. Two years later he succeeded his father as Baron Tyrawley. However, both titles became extinct on the second Baron Tyrawley's death in 1773 without legitimate sons. 

The second creation came in 1789 when Sir John Browne, 7th Baronet, of The Neale, was created Baron Kilmaine, of The Neale in the County of Mayo. He had previously represented Newtownards and Carlow Borough in the Irish House of Commons. His grandson, the third Baron, sat in the House of Lords as an Irish Representative Peer from 1849 to 1873. He was succeeded by his eldest son, the fourth Baron. He was an Irish Representative Peer from 1890 to 1907, when he killed himself by jumping out of the window of a hotel in Paris. His son, the fifth Baron, sat as an Irish Representative Peer from 1911 to 1946, when he also died by suicide by drinking poison. 

The seventh Baron lived in the West Midlands, and was a founder of Whale Tankers Ltd, of Ravenshaw, Solihull. His widow, Linda, is a former High Sheriff of Warwickshire.  the titles are held by the latter's only son, John, the eighth Baron, who succeeded his father in 2013. He lives in a Camphill community in South Wales.

The Browne Baronetcy, of The Neale in the County of Mayo, was created in the Baronetage of Nova Scotia in 1636 for John Browne. However, he never assumed the title. The baronetcy was actually only assumed for the first time by his great-great-grandson, the sixth Baronet. The latter was succeeded by his younger brother, the seventh Baronet, who was created Baron Kilmaine in 1789.

Two other members of the Browne family have been elevated to the peerage. John Browne, 1st Earl of Altamont (the grandfather of John Browne, 1st Marquess of Sligo), was the grandson of Colonel John Browne, younger son of Sir John Browne, 1st Baronet. Consequently, the present Marquess of Sligo is also in remainder to the Browne Baronetcy, of The Neale. Furthermore, Augusta Browne, youngest daughter of the Very Reverend the Hon. Henry Montague Browne, second son of the second Baron Kilmaine, was created Baroness Bolsover in 1880. 

This Browne family of Ireland bears the arms Sable, three lions passant in bend argent between four bendlets argent which are the same arms as borne by the English family of Browne, Viscount Montagu, descended from Sir Anthony Browne (c.1500-1548), KG, of Battle Abbey and Cowdray Park, Master of the Horse to King Henry VIII. However no familial connection between the two families is mentioned in The Complete Peerage (1910).

However, at least as of 2013, the family remained in possession of Shelfield House, Warwickshire.

Barons Kilmaine, First creation (1722)
see the Baron Tyrawley

Browne baronets, of The Neale (1636)
Sir John Browne, 1st Baronet (died 1670)
Sir George Browne, 2nd Baronet (died 1698)
Sir John Browne, 3rd Baronet (died 1711)
Sir George Browne, 4th Baronet (died 1737), MP for Castlebar
Sir John Browne, 5th Baronet (died 1762)
Sir George Browne, 6th Baronet (1725–1765)
Sir John Browne, 7th Baronet (1730–1794) (created Baron Kilmaine in 1789)

Barons Kilmaine, Second creation (1789)
John Browne, 1st Baron Kilmaine (1730–1794)
James Caulfeild Browne, 2nd Baron Kilmaine (1765–1825)
John Cavendish Browne, 3rd Baron Kilmaine (1794–1873)
Francis William Browne, 4th Baron Kilmaine (1843–1907)
John Edward Deane Browne, 5th Baron Kilmaine (1878–1946)
John Francis Archibald Browne, 6th Baron Kilmaine (1902–1978)
John David Henry Browne, 7th Baron Kilmaine (1948–2013)
John Francis Sandford Browne, 8th Baron Kilmaine (born 1983)

The heir presumptive is believed to be Mark Caulfield-Browne (born 1966), a four-times-great-grandson of the Hon. George Browne, youngest son of the first Baron.

See also
Charles Edward Jennings, referred to himself as Baron de Kilmaine
Marquess of Sligo
Baroness Bolsover
Browne baronets of Palmerston

References 

Baronies in the Peerage of Ireland
Noble titles created in 1789
Extinct baronies in the Peerage of Ireland
Noble titles created in 1722
Peerages created for eldest sons of peers
Baron